Grecu is a surname. Notable people with the surname include:

Constantin Grecu (born 1988), Romanian footballer
Dănuț Grecu (born 1950), Romanian gymnast
Mihai Grecu (1916–1998), Moldovan painter
Vlad Grecu (born 1959), Moldovan writer

Romanian-language surnames